(in United Kingdom: New Horizons, in United States: Abrams Discoveries) is an editorial collection of illustrated monographic books published by the Éditions Gallimard in pocket format. The books are concise introductions to particular subjects, written by experts and intended for a general audience.

Created in the style of livre d'art, the collection is based on an abundant pictorial documentation and a way of bringing together visual documents and texts, enhanced by printing on coated paper, as commented in L'Express, "genuine monographs, published like art books". Its creator—Pierre Marchand the "iconophile", as remarked by the German graphic designer Raymond Stoffel—was instrumental in moulding the policy and ideals of the collection, which was an immediate success both in France and internationally.

The first title  (English edition: The Search for Ancient Egypt) appeared on 21 November 1986, authored by the French Egyptologist Jean Vercoutter. These scholarly little books then released in successive volumes, without a systematic plan, each of which is structured like a separate book (see monographic series). 588 titles were published by November 2012, with more than 160 volumes of spin-offs and catalogues as of 2021.

Overview 

The books are printed using A6 format (125 × 178 mm), according to Encyclopædia Universalis, "with breathtaking iconography (illustration)" reproduced on thick and glossy coated paper, from which leap two or three images per page. In this picture-dense format, the authors must squeeze their words in edgewise. Each book is composed of a monograph on a particular topic, the whole collection covers all areas of human knowledge and experience, such as archaeology, art, culture, civilisation, history, music, religion, science, et cetera, with 502 specialists' contributions. Chronological narrative is the principal structure for describing a subject, for example, the  title  (UK ed. The Sky: Order and Chaos), which narrated in chronological order to present the varied subjects relating to the sky above and peoples' perception of it, through historical perspective of cultural, social and religious aspects.

The captions for illustrations must be informative, they should not duplicate information in the body text, nor do they interrupt the narrative thread. Researchers and academics must adhere to the constraints of a mainstream collection. Apart from obvious analytical abilities, authors are expected to write quality text and a sensitivity to illustration. A "Découvertes" is not a book of authorship, the author is only one of the many speakers.

The cover design is one of the specificities. The old covers are glossy with black background illustrated in colour, the newer covers are matt-laminated rather than glossy, but more colourful, with different colour codes according to the subject matter. It differs from other reference books by its visual: a full-size picture, with its framing and the power of figurative elements, also a picture well-matched to the inside page layout, with a tiny, relevant picture illustrating the spine. The visual identity is strong, one can even easily recognise the collection's international editions. However, there are some exceptions, for instance, the Barcelonese publisher Ediciones B adopted a completely different cover design for their collection .

Each book begins with 8–10 full-page illustrations or photographs, prefaced by a pull-quote on the inside front cove, which Thames & Hudson director Jamie Camplin calls it a "cinema-influenced trailer" (designated as pré-générique in French). For the  title Champollion : Un scribe pour l'Égypte, this book opens with a succession of reproductions of Champollion's manuscript Grammaire égyptienne; in L'Europe des Celtes, the reader is greeted by a series of bronze masks and hoary faces carved in stone; the "trailer" for  evokes the tragic launch of the Space Shuttle Challenger in 1986; while that of  presents the Eiffel Tower at every stage of its construction.

The novelty lies in the subtle orchestration of the text and the illustration, where successive sequences, inserts and foldouts overlapping in double pages. Each chapter is built using journalistic methods, with a lead paragraph and intertitle. The  is punctuated by double-page spreads of images, known as inserts, sort of a halt for pictures. For the  title  ('Fear of Wolves'), two double-page spreads of reproductions of Gustave Doré's engravings to illustrate Little Red Riding Hood. These books benefit a lot from journalistic and cinematographic techniques, some titles include panoramic foldouts, kind of projection on big screen. Two foldouts in the  title , one showing Léon Jaussely's reconstruction of the forum of Pompeii, the other representing the actual condition of the theatre quarter in 1859 by using Paul-Émile Bonnet's drawings, both in a panoramic view. In the  title  ('The Paper: A Daily Adventure'), through a partnership with paper companies, there are even three luxurious foldouts that all made on different papers from Arjo Wiggins, presenting one of the  century watercolours on the traditional manufacture of Chinese paper; the other of the engravings and drawings by Albrecht Dürer and Leonardo da Vinci; the third depicts today's paper production line with its different machines.

It works as an anthology, providing more specialised texts from relevant authors, excerpts, historical records, among others. It contains files made jointly by the author or the publisher, with lead paragraph to link texts and short captions for each file. According to the subject, an annex concludes "Documents" section with a chronology, a filmography, a discography or a bibliography, with a "List of Illustrations" giving full details of the sources of illustrations, an alphabetical index, as well as photo credits, dedicated to those who want to go deeper into the subject.

The collection also stands out for its attention to detail. On the choice of typeface, for example, Trump Mediaeval for body text, ITC Franklin Gothic for titling, Zapf Dingbats for guillemets, italic for captions with an initial and the last line is underlined, et cetera. The French editions are printed by Kapp Lahure Jombart in Évreux, while the Italian printer Gianni Stavro, who has largely contributed to the elaboration of new techniques used in the collection, retains his position as collaborator for international reissues and coeditions. The bindings are solid, sewn and not glued. As Gallimard's promise to their readers, "the most beautiful pocket collection in the world".

History 

Découvertes Gallimard was born in Gallimard Jeunesse, based on an idea by Pierre Marchand after the publications of two pocket collections: Découvertes Cadet in 1983 and Découvertes Benjamin in 1984. These three Découvertes collections cater to three levels: grades 4 to 6 (Découvertes Benjamin), grades 7 to 9 (Découvertes Cadet), and grades 10 and up (Découvertes Gallimard). This pocket encyclopaedia initially named  ('The Paths of Knowledge'), Pierre Marchand already had the idea when he entered Gallimard in 1972, as he explained: "I have invested fourteen years of my professional life in this collection. Thanks to the success of 'choose your own adventure books' that we were able to embark on this adventure. [...] For the first time, genuine encyclopaedias in pocket format. [...] Our bet is that once you open the book, no matter what subject you read or which page you are on, you can no longer close it." Françoise Balibar, Jean-Pierre Maury, Jean-Pierre Verdet, Marc Meunier-Thouret and some others were the first to experience this pharaonic project that would await the arrival of Élisabeth de Farcy and Paule du Bouchet, in 1981, for truly to take shape. To producing genuine encyclopaedias in pocket format and fully illustrated in colour, in that time, many judged such an editorial project insane. In November 1986, however, the collection was released at Gallimard and directed by Élisabeth de Farcy. She chose authors and organised iconographic campaigns, several editors and iconographers were then gathered, copious "iconographies" (illustrations) were extracted from heritage resources. Élisabeth explained in an interview with : "The image should occupy a central place, as in a work of art." The authors were sceptical about this project at first, even contemptuous, but they have eventually been fascinated by the collection.

A preview edition, or "zero edition" was sent to 500 booksellers during the summer of 1986. The collection was officially released on 21 November of the same year. The first twelve titles, twenty-five thousand copies of each volume were printed. "We've never seen so many things between the first and last pages of a book" is the slogan proposed by Pascal Manry's advertising agency CLM BBDO for the launch of the collection. Without market research at the start, Pierre Marchand, a self-taught man, explained on the television programme : "This project was as old as my thirst for knowledge. No doubt it is necessary to be precisely self-taught to sense the importance of an encyclopaedia. We must have been forced to build our own culture, to seek reliable references, to make clear statements. To conceive 'Découvertes', I didn't need market research, surveys or tests. Right from the start, I wanted to give the public the books I needed." Although "Découvertes" was reserved for youth at the beginning, it was eventually launched for the general adult public. The collection then had a rapid-growth, 105 titles appeared in five years. The first international collaboration was started with the Madrid-based Spanish publisher  in 1989, and 19 countries would finally be associated with the project. Nevertheless, the Parisian publishing house hesitated, "interesting subject, but how can you illustrate that?" Then De Donder showed a list of about one thousand images that he gathered over years, Gallimard was convinced and made him the first non-French-language author published in the collection.

In the heyday of "Découvertes" at the turn of the 1990s, authors were mainly recruited from academics and curators. Numerous artist monographs were often published on the occasions of major exhibitions, with a predilection for painters and musicians. Such as the  title  was released for the exhibition "Henri Matisse 1904–1917" at the Centre Georges Pompidou in 1993; and Geneviève Haroche-Bouzinac's Élisabeth Vigée Le Brun (from "Hors série") was on sale at the exhibit of Vigée Le Brun's paintings in New York City at the Metropolitan Museum of Art. Alongside many works dictated by current events, there are also a number of "strange curiosities", such as a book devoted to red hair ( – ), which is unusual in this type of collection. Some subjects can be more difficult to sell but considered necessary, such as the perspective ( – ), images of human body ( – ) and mannerism ( – ). But in recent years, there were more monographs on memoirs of places and large institutions instead of artists, as well as various sociological and religious aspects, for instance, a book on the history of New York City by Jerome Charyn, which is translated and adapted from his English work Metropolis: New York as Myth, Marketplace, and Magical Land ( – ); titles on agrifood ( – ), on homosexuality ( – ), or on drugs ( – ); titles about Marian devotions and apparition ( –  &  – ), about Christian saints and Sufism ( –  &  – ). And also numerous volumes devoted to writers, for example, the  title .

Difficult subjects were frequently in demand, possibly because there was less competition. Thus a book on the Cistercian monks ( – ) was one of the bestsellers in 1990. As of 2001, the former would have sold more than five hundred thousand copies worldwide. Competition has emerged as early as in the middle of the 1990s, with a gradual decrease in circulation and novelties, but partially offset by the sub-collection entitled , which is one of the five spin-offs.

Today, about fifteen old titles are updated every year according to current cultural and scientific research. As general history plays a central role in "Découvertes Gallimard", completed by archaeology, art history and science, richly accompanied by unpublished illustrations, thus it forms a solid editorial base. On 25 March 1994, a celebration was held at the Musée national des Monuments Français, for the publication of the  title . The collection experienced two successive redesigns, one in September 1998 ( – ) for exterior model (colour of the back cover, more explicit signage), and the other in March 2000 ( – ) for interior page layout. Those reeditions underwent a decrease in page length, due to the reformulation introduced in the "Documents" section. The collection, which was too soon associated with a zapping visual culture, reaffirmed its first purpose: the image does not take precedence over the text, but combined with text to animate and enrich the reading. These books benefit from the latest technologies, with their mockups are all made using desktop publishing now. Since the QuarkXPress software was only released in 1987, the first 30 titles were made in a traditional way, with phototypesetting. The current price of a "Découvertes" book is between 8.40 and 15.90 euros (£7.95 in UK, $12.95–$14.95 in US and $19.95 in Canada) according to its category and number of pages, this is considered an extremely low price for a book of this quality.

The collection, totalling 588 volumes, is never entirely translated into another language, partial translations have been made available in 19 languages (currently more than 20 languages, see "International editions"). "This inexpensive pocket encyclopaedia embodies its humanistic dream: to make the most advanced state of knowledge available to everyone. Diderot and D'Alembert would not have denied it...", commented by Hedwige Pasquet, current directress of Gallimard Jeunesse. In 2002, during a presentation of "Découvertes Gallimard" in Moscow, the French ambassador to Russia  told a Kommersant correspondent that he just finished reading , one of the latest titles from the collection at the time, which he found particularly interesting.

In order to remedy the problems of international proprietaries and reproduction rights of works of art, co-publishers firstly define a number of titles, then they choose according to their own editorial line, and share the high cost of worldwide photographic rights. Therefore, Harry N. Abrams in the United States chose more titles on traditional cultural subjects, such as À la recherche de la Rome antique or La Naissance de la Grèce; while in Japan, the publisher  prefers original titles, such as the  title  ('Witches: Fiancées of Satan'), and the  title  ('The Hour of the Great Passage: Chronicle of Death'). The Madrilenian publisher Aguilar was the first one among "Découvertes"' international co-publishers since 1989, the first 12 titles for the Spanish collection  were released in the same year. In Italy, the publisher Electa/Gallimard produced 128 titles within seven years; in Japan, the  title for their series  ('Rediscovery of Knowledge') has been published in early 2017. In addition, foreign editions are usually co-printed to amortise fees and support countries with small circulation.

In addition to foreign publishers, Découvertes Gallimard has also been involved in national institutional partnerships for several years, notably the one held since 1989 with the Réunion des Musées Nationaux (RMN): thirty-two titles have been released (as of 2001), plus a title in English dedicated to Jean-Baptiste-Camille Corot ( – Corot: Extraordinary landscapes), the boxed set  (1994) and four books in the "Hors série". The principle of these co-editions is based on a sharing of costs and revenues, the RMN brings its knowledge of museums and distribution network, while the publisher brings its editorial competence. When a title is linked to an exhibition, it generates a lot of additional sales through the RMN. Other partnerships with public or private companies, such as the French Alternative Energies and Atomic Energy Commission ( – ), Crédit Mutuel ( – ), L'Oréal ( – ), paper industries ( – ), et cetera. The partner is sometimes explicitly indicated in the "acknowledgments", but it is most often mentioned equivocally, even modestly kept in silence ( – ).

Nonfiction book publishing has been in decline in France for several years, market saturation is one of the causes, competition from other medias is another, especially from the internet. Despite its excellent image to the public, Découvertes Gallimard is also concerned by this disaffection. It remains an indisputable success internationally, but in France, the sales are eroding. The number of new productions decreases and also the prints. On 1 March 1999, the creator of Découvertes, Pierre Marchand, after working for 27 years at Gallimard, left to become a creative director at Hachette. This was no doubt a big loss to the collection, but with more than 10 years of experience and a rich fund created over years, Découvertes finally surpassed the difficulties. The end of 2006 is marked by the celebration of the collection's  anniversary and the publication of its  title . A website was specially created on this occasion, which is the current official website http://www.decouvertes-gallimard.fr. On the occasion of Éditions Gallimard's centenary in 2011, the  title  ('Gallimard: A Publisher at Work') was launched as the first e-book for iPad of "Découvertes".

Image 

Full colour pictures, documentary illustrations, archival photographs, historical maps occupy a central place in this work, as said Pierre Marchand himself: "the language of images is a universal language". But in the 1980s, desktop publishing and photo digitisation did not exist, the sophisticated mockups were entirely handmade and the iconographers ran around museums, libraries, painting galleries and other agencies to look for documents. Today, the technology has simplified all these procedures but the difficulty lies elsewhere, the status of the image is increasingly complex.

Contemporary subjects often generate much higher costs since the publisher is obliged to work with photographic agencies. In the choice of documents, priority is given to those original, unpublished images. Besides, the iconographers of Découvertes have some exceptional documents, such as English explorer Frederick Catherwood's original drawings of Maya ruins decorate the  title Les cités perdues des Mayas.

It's not difficult to illustrate subjects like arts, civilisations, archaeology... But when it comes to a topic like "pain" ( – ) or "sustainable development" ( – ), it becomes more delicate. The question is how to avoid repetitiveness or the flatly illustrative image, the solution lies in a broadening field, through the use of historical documents, works of art and film stills.

Case study of aestheticisation movement 
The aestheticisation of postmodern everyday life, according to sociologists Michel Maffesoli and Mike Featherstone, it seems to spring from two parallel movements rooted in modernity, the so-called "dual postmodern aestheticisation movement": first an aesthetic hedonism (Maffesoli) and second the trivialisation of art (Featherstone). The second movement is the result of the de-academisation and de-institutionalisation of art, thus "art is part of everyday life". Découvertes Gallimard is considered an example of 'art as part of everyday life' within this study.

Pierre Marchand, Head of Gallimard Jeunesse who created the new kind of artistic encyclopaedia with a dynamic layout, that would be as much a magazine as an encyclopaedia. It has been commented by a Gallimard employee that Découvertes "seduces like a magazine but has the length of a book", kind of an objectified and specialised luxury magazine. A lot of work and research have been done on the reproduction of images and the choice of illustrations, often unpublished documents like antique engravings, old photos, on all types of themes. In this collection, all books share the same concept as to layout and looks, each book itself could become a work of art rather than only its substitute. It is coupled with up-to-date editing equipment, organisational innovations and a constant pursuit of higher printing quality at lower cost. A more friendship than business relationship between Marchand and the Italian printer Gianni Stavro has advanced the state of the art in printing. The suppliers of "Découvertes" are supposed to cooperate between themselves, "for instance, the French printer had a problem concerning the pigments, so the Italian printer invited him over to explain how he could solve the problem", explained by a Gallimard employee.

Pierre Marchand might not be an "Artistic Master", but he is almost considered as such by his employees. "Découvertes"' staff work like a team, where everybody is concerned with everything at the same time. They share the same culture and values, their office is intentionally built like a vessel, with Marchand as captain on the bridge, and anyone, at any time, is free to contribute with his/her own ideas about authors, pictures, front covers..., and becomes leader of a project.

Spin-offs 
 : Literally 'Another History of the  Century'. A closed series within Découvertes Gallimard collection released in 1999, consisting of ten volumes for ten decades, authored by French historian  and based on the Gaumont cinematographic archives.
 : A sub-collection published since 1994, the title roughly translates as 'off-series' or 'off-collection'. "Hors série" books are even smaller (120 × 170 mm, generally, but not always), each one consists of 48 pages with full colour illustrations. These books are designed like museum guide booklets, according to Gallimard, "" ('books to visit like an exhibition'). Most of them are dedicated to artists like Botticelli, Arcimboldo, Fragonard, Soutine, Le Gray, et cetera, during major exhibitions devoted to them.
 : A sub-collection consists of 13 volumes, 12 volumes released in 1992 and one in 1994, a larger format (210 × 270 mm) is used for them.
 : A 6-volume sub-collection released in 1998 (124 × 178 mm), inspired by the "Documents" section at the back of every Découvertes book.
 : A sub-collection of exhibition booklets created in 2018, with the smaller format (120 × 170 mm).

The "Hors série" books are often coupled with art exhibitions and it works well. While the other attempts to diversify the collection have often resulted in resounding commercial failures, such as the "Albums" and "Texto". Despite an interesting concept: the use of still images from Gaumont archives for "Une autre histoire du XXe siècle", this series has had mixed success.

English edition 

A small portion of the collection has been translated into English, published by Thames & Hudson in United Kingdom under the title New Horizons series, which launched its first titles in 1992 with the slogan, "the expanding universe between two covers". According to Thames & Hudson director Jamie Camplin, the remit is to "educate in an entertaining way".

Paul Gottlieb, former director and editor in chief of the New York-based publisher Abrams Books (then called Harry N. Abrams), discovered Pierre Marchand's "Découvertes" at the Gallimard stand during the Bologna Book Fair in 1991, which he called "a dazzling array of books" and an "imaginative combination of text and pictures in a magnificently produced series of paperback books". He began to negotiate for English language translation. The collection was eventually titled Abrams Discoveries series by the U.S. publisher. They began to publish in the spring of 1992, and more than 100 titles were produced by 2008.

The two publishers shared the translation costs, the American edition was then re-edited to take into account English spelling, or vice versa. Unlike the numbered French edition, American and British editions are not put into numerical order.

Apart from spelling and punctuation differences, certain titles of American edition have additional explanation placed in parentheses within the body text. For instance, in The Celts: Conquerors of Ancient Europe: "Bohemia (now part of the Czech Republic)", "Gaelic (meaning an Irish or Scottish Celt)", or "Iberian Peninsula (Spain and Portugal)"; whereas in the British version The Celts: First Masters of Europe, has no such additional information. Besides, the texts are not entirely identical. As for the "Documents" section, though some co-publishers print the entire French version, Thames & Hudson reformulates this part, tailoring the material to suit the nuances of the UK market.

Reception 
French weekly magazine Télérama praised "Découvertes Gallimard", described the work as: "they borrow suspense from the cinema, have efficiency of the journalism, literary temperament is their charm, and art is their beauty". New York magazine remarked the collection "a lively interweaving of simple text and clever pictures". In his review for Die Zeit, the German literary scholar and historian  wrote that the collection is an "adventure stands for surprise, excitement and amusement. Boredom is already prevented by the curiosity of vivid illustrations which are accompanied by detailed explanations". Rick Poynor wrote in Eye magazine that the collection "is one of the great projects of contemporary popular publishing". Raleigh Trevelyan's article in The New York Times mentioned D-Day and the Invasion of Normandy from "Abrams Discoveries" series, said "all volumes in the 'Discoveries' series are ingeniously designed". Art critic John Russell considered these books contain unique information, such as Aelian's authority on the musicality of the elephant or the precise look of Halley's Comet as it was depicted in 1835. Eduardo Gudiño Kieffer of La Nación also gave the collection a positive review, writing, "The books are excellent assistants for intellectuals, writers, journalists and students of different aspects of the culture, [...] they contain accurate and pithy information. [...] They obtain a cognitive 'duration' difficult to achieve in the mediatic fugacity." The Spanish newspaper El País: "Those books combine an important 'Documents' section with an original thematic concept. It's obviously a work of education and popularisation, but popularisation of very good level." The Brazilian newspapers – Folha de S.Paulo: "What is most striking in the collection, however, is not the eclecticism or the unusual themes—usually developed by French experts—but the format and the iconographic content thereof."; : "almost like a luxury comic magazine and of exquisite taste".

According to the French magazine L'Expansion, some other positive reviews including The Times: "A brand-new and daring collection"; Die Zeit: "As soon as you open these handy books, you can not get away from them anymore"; The New York Times Book Review: "A collection that recalls nineteenth-century encyclopaedias, where intelligence went hand in hand with curiosity". The French news magazine L'Express: "Genuine monographs, published like art books, offered in pocket format and sold at an affordable price. [...] 'Découvertes' changed the face of encyclopaedism and art book, adapting the book to the era of 'zapping'." —a French bimonthly journal—referred to the collection as a "classic".

Despite all the favours to its quality and attractive visual design, the collection suffers from a problem of identity in bookshops: where to put these books? With books for youth or books for adults? As pocket books or human science reference books? And opt for a thematic scattering on the shelves. Many booksellers renounce the displays that were exclusively reserved for "Découvertes" due to high competition. All the more so because a rather tight inventory management at Gallimard, the complete titles are never available at the same time, which is not appreciated by the customers. The problem of identification is also latent in print media, the journalists, even if they are personally delighted to receive the new titles from a press agent, would not be too enthusiastic about presenting a simple pocket book in their articles, even if it's a brand new title and not a reprint.

List of English-translated volumes

Documentary adaptation 
Documentary adaptations of "Découvertes Gallimard" started in 1997, the project is a co-production of Arte France and Trans Europe Film, and in collaboration with Éditions Gallimard. These 52-minute films are produced as part of The Human Adventure, a documentary television programme of Arte. Nine of them were directed by Jean-Claude Lubtchansky.

List of documentary films:

International editions

See also 

 For Dummies, a similar American series of introductory books.
 Que sais-je?, a similar series of introductory books published by the Presses Universitaires de France.
 Rough Guides, a similar British series of introductory books.
 Very Short Introductions, a similar series of introductory books published by the Oxford University Press.
 World of Art, an illustrated art encyclopaedia series published by Thames & Hudson.

Notes

References

Sources 
 In the beginning was the picture: NEW HORIZONS by Jim Davies at Eye
 Revelations in style: Gallimard's Découvertes series secures readers' loyalty by showing respect for their curiosity and intelligence by Rick Poynor at Eye
  Découvertes Gallimard ou la culture encyclopédique à la française by Françoise Hache-Bissette, senior lecturer at the Paris Descartes University. This article is published in the conference proceedings at Sorbonne in December 2001 ( of ).

External links 

  
 Découvertes Gallimard Arts series at Éditions Gallimard 
 Découvertes Gallimard Archéologie series at Éditions Gallimard 
 Découvertes Gallimard Histoire series at Éditions Gallimard 
 Découvertes Gallimard Littératures series at Éditions Gallimard 
 Découvertes Gallimard Religions series at Éditions Gallimard 
 Découvertes Gallimard Culture et société series at Éditions Gallimard 
 Découvertes Gallimard Sciences et techniques series at Éditions Gallimard 
 Découvertes Gallimard Texto at Éditions Gallimard 
 Découvertes Gallimard Albums at Éditions Gallimard 
 Une autre histoire du XX siècle at Éditions Gallimard 
 Découvertes Gallimard Hors série at Éditions Gallimard 
 Découvertes Gallimard Carnet d'expo at Éditions Gallimard 
 List of books in "Abrams Discoveries" series at Goodreads
 List of books in 'New Horizons' series at Publishing History

 
French documentary films